Joyce Cansfield (née Patrick; 1929 – 12 October 2019) was a British crossword compiler (compiling under the name Machiavelli for The Listener), who set more than 1,000 puzzles for The Times. She was also the 1980 UK national Scrabble champion, 1982 Countdown winner and 1983 Brain of Mensa. She studied for her undergraduate degree in statistics at Westfield College, University of London and her early career involved the running of an early mainframe computer at the UK's Dental Estimates Board in Eastbourne. Later on she worked at the University of Leeds as a statistician.

Cansfield died in 2019.

References

Crossword compilers
1929 births
2019 deaths
Alumni of Westfield College